The Rise of the Phoenix is the seventh studio album by American R&B artist Chanté Moore released on September 29, 2017, through CM7 Records. The album has been preceded by the release of two singles — "Real One" and "Something to Remember". The album was released exactly 25 years from the date of her debut album Precious (1992).

Background and release

On October 28, 2016, Moore announced the title of her upcoming seventh studio album "The Rise of the Phoenix" via her Twitter and Instagram "Thinkin about my day~ my life~ my man💋~ my new CD.... "The Rise of The Phoenix!" Coming 2/17/17 My day of Birth & REbirth!". On January 31, 2017, Moore announced the title of the lead single from her album "Real One", with a teaser of the song for fans to listen before its initial release on February 3, 2017. Between 2013 and this album, she filmed three seasons of the notable TV One series R&B Divas LA. She also wrote an autobiographical help-book titled "Will I Marry Me?" which is about her past, present, and future relationships and how they affect her personal life, and acts as the subject matter for this album.

Originally the album was scheduled to be released on February 17, 2017, then was pushed back to March and then June. On June 26, 2017, Moore announced in an interview "The Rise of the Phoenix" would be released in September and a Christmas album will be released also. On August 7, 2017, Moore released a promotional video announcing the release of her album would be available to pre-order on August 11, 2017 along with revealing the cover art. The following day the album's track list was announced. The album premiered on streaming services on September 8 but was pulled down less than a week later., while the digital release date was rescheduled to September 29 and the physical release for October 20.

Singles
"Real One" was released as the album's lead single on February 3, 2017. The music video premiered on March 20, 2017. The song debuted at number 29 on the Adult R&B Songs chart on April 1, 2017 and has since reached its peak at number ten on the week beginning August 19, 2017. "Something to Remember" was released as the album's second single, with a music video premiering on August 13, 2017. In the week of November 4, 2017, "Something to Remember" debuted at number 30 on the Adult R&B Songs chart, rising to number 27 the following week.

Track listing
Credits adapted from the liner notes of The Rise of the Phoenix.

Charts

Release history

References

2017 albums
Chanté Moore albums